Women's slalom events at the 2006 Winter Paralympics were contested at Sestriere on 18 and 19 March.

There were 3 events. Each was contested by skiers from a range of disability classes, and the standings were decided by applying a disability factor to the actual times achieved. All times shown below are calculated times, except for the final "Real time" column.

Visually impaired

The visually impaired event took place on 19 March. It was won by Pascale Casanova, representing .

Sitting

The sitting event took place on 19 March. It was won by Stephani Victor, representing .

Standing

The standing event took place on 18 March. It was won by Allison Jones, representing .

References

W
Para